The peashooter (sometimes spelled pea-shooter or pea shooter) is a toy version of the blowgun or blowpipe. It is usually a tube that launches its projectiles via blowing. As the name suggests the normal ammunition is peas (usually dried), though other seeds, fruits, improvised darts, or wadded up paper can also be used. The P-26 fighter aircraft was nicknamed the shooter of peas because it has no visible armament (it had two machine guns on the floor of the cockpit shooting through the propeller). It did, however, have a long tube gunsight just forward of the windscreen that appeared to be its only armament.

Peashooting
Peashooting (sometimes spelled pea-shooting or pea shooting) is the act of shooting dried peas out of a tube, a peashooter, by blowing through it. A similar effect can be achieved by using small bits of paper instead of peas. A sport has developed around pea shooting, in which peas are shot into a target, similar to those used for archery. The target may be made of a soft substance (putty) so that the peas will stick into it or at least make indentations that easily identify the location of the hit. The World Pea Shooting Championships are held annually in the village of Witcham, UK.

References

External links 

Toy weapons
Games and sports introduced in 1970